Pentti Uolevi Tiusanen (6 March 1949, Kotka – 8 December 2018) was a Finnish politician and member of Finnish Parliament, representing the Left Alliance. He was elected to Finnish Parliament in the 1995 election. As his civil profession, Tiusanen was a surgeon.

References

External links
Parliament of Finland: Pentti Tiusanen 
Home page 

1949 births
2018 deaths
People from Kotka
Democratic Alternative (Finland) politicians
Left Alliance (Finland) politicians
Members of the Parliament of Finland (1995–99)
Members of the Parliament of Finland (1999–2003)
Members of the Parliament of Finland (2003–07)
Members of the Parliament of Finland (2007–11)